Gyrth Godwinson (Old English: Gyrð Godƿinson;  1032 – 14 October 1066) was the fourth son of Earl Godwin, and thus a younger brother of Harold Godwinson. He went with his eldest brother Sweyn into exile to Flanders in 1051, but unlike Sweyn he was able to return with the rest of the clan the following year. Along with his brothers Harold and Tostig, Gyrth was present at his father's death-bed.

Biography
Following the death of his father in April 1053, the Godwinsons managed to retain their hold on England. Harold inherited the Earldom of Wessex and became second in power only to the king. Gyrth was made Earl of East Anglia, Cambridgeshire and Oxfordshire some time between 1055 and 1057. Together with his brother Leofwine's Earldoms of Kent, Essex, Middlesex, Hertford, Surrey and probably Buckinghamshire the Godwinsons now controlled the entirety of East England.

According to Orderic Vitalis and William of Malmesbury, Gyrth tried (ineffectually) to prevent Harold from engaging William of Normandy in battle, saying that he instead could lead the English forces and that he must stay in London to lead another battle and reminding him of the oath which he had sworn to William. Harold, however, ignored Gyrth's advice. Gyrth fought at and was killed in the Battle of Hastings alongside his brothers Harold and Leofwine.

Popular culture
Gyrth was portrayed by actor Malcolm Webster in the two-part BBC TV play Conquest (1966), part of the series Theatre 625.

Citations

Sources

External links
 

House of Godwin
Anglo-Norse people
Anglo-Saxon people
Norman conquest of England
Earls of East Anglia
11th-century English people
Anglo-Saxons killed in battle
1030s births
1066 deaths